A Hard Day's Death is the first of a planned series of original mystery/thrillers by former James Bond author Raymond Benson. Published in April 2008 by Leisure Books it has a rock and roll setting and features a detective named Spike Berenger. The book's title derives from The Beatles' album A Hard Day's Night.

A second book was published in 2009, titled Dark Side of the Morgue based on Pink Floyd's album The Dark Side of the Moon.

References

External links
 Publisher's Website

2008 American novels
American mystery novels
American thriller novels
Leisure Books books